Vampira is a 1994 film directed by Joey Romero and starring Maricel Soriano and Christopher de Leon.

Synopsis
Marical Soriano plays Cara who was let with a grave mission to break the horrible curse that has been keeping her family lurking in the dark for a very long time. Yet all her plans were stalled when she unexpectedly found love in the arms of the humble architect named Arman (Christopher De Leon). To hide her dark past from him, Cara is forced to reinvent herself and changes her name to Paz. Everything seemed blissful until one fateful night, Arman shockingly discovers the truth upon seeing Cara's blood drenched mouth and arms.

Unfortunately, time is running out for Cara and she has to find a way to end the curse before she and her beloved clan completely turn into blood hungry immortals. But Cara needs to face and stop the fury of her power hungry brother, Miguel (Jayvee Gayoso) who relishes on turning the world into pitch black darkness. As she finds herself pitted between life and death, Cara soon realizes that love and forgiveness shall be her only salvation to survive.

Awards
The film was named Best Film by the Young Critics Circle Film Desk and has earned Maricel Soriano the best performer award from the same body. Vampira also features an ensemble featuring Caridad Sanchez, Joanne Quintas, Lorli Villanueva, Boy 2 Quizon and Ms. Nida Blanca who got FAMAS Best Supporting Actress nomination for her role as Maricel's mother in the movie.

References

External links

1994 films
1990s Tagalog-language films
Philippine drama films
Philippine horror films
Vampires in film